Yes, Yes, Nonet is an album by American jazz saxophonist Lee Konitz's Nonet recorded in 1979 and released on the Danish SteepleChase label.

Critical reception

Scott Yanow on Allmusic noted: "It's an excellent outing from a somewhat neglected group".

Track listing 
All compositions by Jimmy Knepper except where noted.
 "Dearth of a Nation" – 6:05
 "Languid" – 6:13
 "Footprints" (Wayne Shorter) – 8:04
 "Stardust" (Hoagy Carmichael, Mitchell Parish) – 5:13
 "Primrose Path" – 6:32
 "Noche Triste" – 4:33
 "My Buddy" (Walter Donaldson, Gus Kahn) – 3:31

Personnel 
Lee Konitz – alto saxophone, soprano saxophone
John Eckert, Tom Harrell – trumpet, flugelhorn
Jimmy Knepper – trombone
Sam Burtis – bass trombone
Ronnie Cuber – baritone saxophone, soprano saxophone
Harold Danko – piano 
Buster Williams – bass
Billy Hart – drums

References 

Lee Konitz albums
1979 albums
SteepleChase Records albums